Michael "Mike" Kjellander (born 14 March 1964) is a Swedish former professional water skier. He won the US Pro Tour 21 times (four times total winner), two times Masters champion, one-time US Open champion, 15 times European champion, 32 times national champion, two silver and one bronze from World Championship and one-time world record holder. He specialized in slalom and jump but was initially also successful as an overall skier. He is still the national current record holder in trick with a score of 7,760 points (set in 1984).

Biography
He grew up in Ödeshög Sweden together with his sister Helena and brother Richard, who were also successful water skiers. He started to water ski at the age of six at Motala Water Ski Club. At an early age, he was also a competitive downhill skier and combined it successfully by living in Northern Sweden for part of the year. At the age of 16, he gave up snow skiing and went to live in Florida and water ski professionally. At the age of 17, he won his first open European Championships title in slalom. In 1988, broke the world slalom record in West Palm Beach, Florida with a score of one buoy on 10.25 meters (41 feet off). He was the first person in the world to successfully run through 10.75 meters (39.5 feet off). Kjellander was known for his aggressive style when skiing and came to be known as "Slam Dunk Mike". As a testimony for his successful career and contribution to the sport, he was inducted to the Water Ski Hall of Fame in 2015.

Achievements

References

External links
 
 

1964 births
Living people
Male professional water skiers
Swedish water skiers
People from Ödeshög Municipality
Sportspeople from Östergötland County